DBRS Morningstar is a global credit rating agency (CRA) founded in 1976 (originally known as Dominion Bond Rating Service in Toronto). DBRS was acquired by the global financial services firm Morningstar, Inc. in 2019 for approximately $700 million. Following the acquisition, DBRS's operations have been integrated with Morningstar Inc.'s credit ratings business, Morningstar Credit Ratings, to create DBRS Morningstar.

Overview
DBRS Morningstar, which has offices in Toronto, New York, Chicago, London, Frankfurt and Madrid, is the fourth-largest credit rating agency by global market share, with approximately between 2% and 3% of global market share. DBRS comprises five affiliated operating companies – DBRS Limited; DBRS, Inc.; DBRS Ratings Limited; DBRS Ratings GmbH; and DBRS Ratings GmbH, Sucursal en España.

Following the acquisition of DBRS and Morningstar Credit Ratings, Detlef Scholz was named president of the credit ratings business.

Registered with the U.S. Securities and Exchange Commission (SEC) as a Nationally Recognized Statistical Rating Organization (NRSRO) pursuant to the Credit Rating Agency Reform Act of 2006 (CRA Reform Act) and the rules adopted thereunder.

DBRS is registered as a Nationally Recognized Statistical Rating Organization from the United States' Securities and Exchange Commission (SEC), one of only 10 companies to hold the designation.

Registered as a CRA in the European Union (EU) in accordance with Regulation (EC) No 1060/2009 of the European Parliament, amended by Regulation (EU) No 513/2011 and No 462/2013 on CRAs (the EU CRA Regulation).and with the Ontario Securities Commission (OSC) in Canada.

The company is one of only four CRAs, including larger competitors Standard & Poor's, Moody's Investors Service, and Fitch Ratings, to receive ECAI recognition from the European Central Bank (ECB). That designation indicates CRAs whose ratings can be used by the ECB to determine collateral requirements for borrowing from the ECB. In recent years, DBRS Morningstar's sovereign ratings on European nations, including Portugal, Ireland and Italy, were used by the ECB for such purposes.

On May 29, 2019, Morningstar, Inc. announced their acquisition of DBRS in an approximately $700 million cash and stock transaction. The takeover closed on July 2, 2019.

History

The company was founded by Walter Schroeder, who started sketching out a business plan while driving to Montreal on a family vacation. He developed the rating agency from scratch, starting the company with less than $1,000. The company opened its first office, a tiny 1,500-square-foot office, in Toronto. Mr. Schroeder and his family sold the company to The Carlyle Group and Warburg Pincus, who then sold the company to its current owner, Morningstar Inc.

Since those beginnings, DBRS has expanded to become the largest rating agency in Canada, with operations in the U.S. and Europe. It first opened offices in Chicago and New York in 2003; opened its current office in London in 2010; opened in Frankfurt in 2018 and Madrid in 2019. In 2008, the organization changed its name from Dominion Bond Rating Service to DBRS.

Today, DBRS Morningstar has about 700 employees worldwide and rates more than 3,000 issuer families and nearly 60,000 securities worldwide.

Corporate and Operating Structures

DBRS Limited is the operating company in Canada. DBRS, Inc. is the operating company in the United States. DBRS Ratings Limited is the operating entity based in London and is home to the agency's broader European operations. DBRS Ratings GmbH is the German operating unit and DBRS Ratings GmbH, Sucursal en España is the operating company in Spain.

Ratings
DBRS Morningstar provides independent credit rating services for financial institutions, corporate and sovereign entities and structured finance products and instruments throughout all geographies where it operates.
Credit ratings are forward-looking opinions about credit risk that reflect the creditworthiness of an entity or security. The Rating Committee process facilitates rating decisions, which are a collective assessment of DBRS Morningstar's opinion rather than the view of an individual analyst, are based on sufficient information that incorporates both global and local considerations and the use of approved methodologies and are independent of any actual or perceived conflicts of interest.

DBRS Viewpoint 
DBRS Viewpoint is an online platform launched in 2016 (previously known as iReports) that provides interactive access to commercial mortgage-backed securities transaction information, as well as commentaries and work product, for DBRS Morningstar-rated deals. Users receive greater transparency into credit analysis and supporting data through the platform.

Regulation 
In Canada, DBRS Morningstar is regulated through the Canadian Securities Administrators with its principal regulator being the OSC. CRAs in Canada must become a "designated rating organization" in order for their opinions to be eligible for use under securities laws.

In the U.S., DBRS Morningstar is regulated by the SEC in accordance with the rules that were prosed as part of the Dodd-Frank Act and provide additional governance, transparency, conflicts of interest and performance measurement requirements on the CRA industry.

In Europe, DBRS Morningstar is regulated by ESMA and the FCA. Additional rules – CRA III – have been adopted in Europe focused on increasing competition, ratings transparency and independence, standardizing Sovereign ratings and adding new liability whether or not a contract is in place.

See also
A.M. Best
Bloomberg L.P.
Dun & Bradstreet
Egan-Jones Ratings Company
Fitch Ratings
Kroll Bond Rating Agency
Moody's
Morningstar, Inc.
Nationally Recognized Statistical Rating Organizations
Reuters
Standard & Poor's

References

External links
DBRS Methodologies

Financial services companies of Canada
Credit rating agencies
Financial services companies established in 1976
1976 establishments in Ontario
2019 mergers and acquisitions